Bernhard Keil or Keyl (1624 – 3 February 1687) was a Danish Baroque painter who became a pupil of Rembrandt.

Biography
Keil was born in Helsingør.  According to the RKD he was a pupil of the Danish painter Morten Steenwinkel, who became a pupil of Rembrandt in Amsterdam in the years 1642–1644. In 1645-1648 he was with Hendrick Uylenburgh and he had a workshop of his own in the years 1649–1651. In 1656 he travelled to Rome, and is registered there until 1687, when he died. He also worked in Bergamo and Venice. He was influenced by Jan Lievens and in turn influenced the painters Pietro Bellotti  (1627-1700), Antonio Cifrondi, and Giacomo Francesco Cipper.

References

Bernhard Keil on Artnet

1624 births
1687 deaths
17th-century Danish painters
Danish Baroque painters
Danish male painters
People from Helsingør
Pupils of Rembrandt